Roesler House, in Austin County, Texas about  west of Nelsonville, was listed on the National Register of Historic Places in 1984.

It is a board-and-batten farmhouse built in 1892.  It has also been known as the Old Roesler Place.

It is a one-and-a-half-story building which is a "good example of a late nineteenth century vernacular German farmhouse in the area."

It was a home of Frederick August Roesler.  As The Old Roesler Place, it is a Recorded Texas Historical Landmark.

References

Farmhouses in the United States
National Register of Historic Places in Austin County, Texas
Houses completed in 1892